Wild cucumber may refer to

Echinocystis, a genus of gourds found throughout most of North America
Marah, a genus of gourds native to western North America
Armenian cucumber, a melon which when pickled is sold as "pickled wild cucumber" in Middle Eastern markets